Exponent CMS is a free, open-source, open standards modular enterprise software framework and content management system (CMS) written in the programming language PHP.

Exponent CMS editing system allows website content to be edited on the page as it appears - without back-end administration.
The default installation includes a set of modules for managing a typical website. Additional modules are developed by a community of open-source developers and can be installed via a web browser.

Exponent CMS can be installed in a Linux, Unix, Mac OS X or Windows environment, or any platform that supports the Apache web server and the PHP language (version 5.6.x+). Exponent CMS currently requires a MySQL (5+) or MariaDB database to store content and settings.

History 
Exponent CMS was originally written and designed by James Hunt of OIC Group, Inc, starting in 2001.  Minor contributions were made by other OIC members, Fred Dirkse, Greg Otte and Adam Kessler, but most of the original work was done by Hunt. In 2005 Hunt left the OIC Group. Bug fixes were done on Exponent by Dirkse from 2005 - 2006. In 2006 Kessler came back to OIC Group and together he and Dirkse tried to revitalize the project. The release of version 96.6 followed shortly thereafter.

During the summer of 2007 OIC hired Phillip Ball who was an active member of the Exponent CMS Open Source community.  Version 0.97 was shipped shortly after.

While trying to get the 0.97 release ready, Kessler started planning out a new model–view–controller (MVC) framework for Exponent and Ball was involved with the YUI Library.  The two different research path converged in the fall of 2007 as Kessler and Ball started on a new version.  Kessler wrote the new Exponent Framework and Ball cleaned up and re-wrote the interface, trying to tightly integrate the YUI Javascript library.  The result was Exponent 2 or Exponent MVC. Exponent 2 was released in the summer of 2011 following a series of pre-release versions.

Exponent 2.0 release 

The 2.0 version of Exponent was released under the GPL.

On January 29, 2014 the Exponent CMS site switched to new forum software. In addition, a software bug reporting system is available.

The core functionality of Exponent CMS and Exponent Framework is still managed by OIC Group with a community of open source developers making module, translation and theme contributions.

Current Exponent CMS software news is provided via the website blog.

Themes 
The Exponent CMS was designed from the ground up with designers in mind.  Themes for Exponent CMS are written using HTML/XHTML and CSS. Hooks are placed in the theme file to integrate Exponent CMS into the theme. Any html based design can be converted into an Exponent theme.

In Exponent CMS content and presentation have been separated.  To accomplish this the Smarty template engine was used for creation of views. Views allow the same content to be displayed in different looks and customized to match the theme of a site.

Translations 
Translations for Exponent CMS interface are available in 3 languages: US English (the default), Danish and German.

See also 

 Content management system
 List of content management systems

References

External links
 Exponent CMS website
 Exponent CMS on Facebook 
 Exponent CMS on Twitter
 Exponent CMS Documentation website
 Open Source CMS Exponent Demo

Free content management systems
Web frameworks
Free software programmed in PHP
Blog software
Content management systems